Evolutionist Liberal Party of Ceará was a political party in Ceará, Brazil. The party contested the October 14, 1934 elections to the Federal Chamber and the Ceará Constituent Assembly. The party nominated 11 candidates for the federal election and 30 candidates for the state assembly. One of the 30 state election candidates of the party was Adilia de Albuquerque Moraes, one of five female candidates in the fray. Albuquerque contested on the slogan "For the defence of women". None of its candidates were elected.

References

Defunct political parties in Brazil
Liberal parties in Brazil
Political parties established in 1934
1934 establishments in Brazil
Political parties disestablished in 1934
1934 disestablishments in Brazil